Bartlett House, a historic railroad hotel, restored in 2016 to house a kitchen, bakery, and cafe.  It was built about 1870, and is a three-story, five bay by five bay, square, Italianate style brick building on a raised basement.  It features a full width front porch at the primary story and decorative cornice.  The name BARTLETT HOUSE appears in white lettering between the second and third stories.

History
The Bartlett House was built in 1870 by Ebenezer Bartlett and served as a hotel for railroad travelers. In the mid-1900s, the hotel was the subject of photographs by Walker Evans. The photos were displayed at the Metropolitan Museum of Art in New York. The Bartlett House continued to operate as a railroad hotel for the New York and Harlem and Hudson and Boston Railroads until about 1948. After the rail line was abandoned, the hotel fell into many years of disuse.

In 2012, the Bartlet House was added to the National Register of Historic Places .
In 2016, the Barlett House was renovated and is now open to the public as café and bakery.

References 

Hotel buildings on the National Register of Historic Places in New York (state)
Italianate architecture in New York (state)
Hotel buildings completed in 1870
Buildings and structures in Columbia County, New York
National Register of Historic Places in Columbia County, New York
Railway hotels in the United States